Stade Pierre Rajon is a multi-purpose stadium in Bourgoin-Jallieu, France.

It is currently used mostly for rugby union and football matches and is the home stadium of CS Bourgoin-Jallieu and FC Bourgoin-Jallieu. The stadium can hold close to 10,000 people.

See also

List of rugby league stadiums by capacity
List of rugby union stadiums by capacity

References

Pierre Rajon
Sports venues in Isère
Multi-purpose stadiums in France